Takahisa Yoshida (born 17 February 1970) is a Japanese former high jumper who competed in the 2000 Summer Olympics.

Competition record

References

1970 births
Living people
Sportspeople from Kanagawa Prefecture
Japanese male high jumpers
Olympic male high jumpers
Olympic athletes of Japan
Athletes (track and field) at the 2000 Summer Olympics
Asian Games gold medalists for Japan
Asian Games bronze medalists for Japan
Asian Games gold medalists in athletics (track and field)
Asian Games medalists in athletics (track and field)
Athletes (track and field) at the 1990 Asian Games
Athletes (track and field) at the 1994 Asian Games
Athletes (track and field) at the 1998 Asian Games
Medalists at the 1990 Asian Games
Medalists at the 1994 Asian Games
World Athletics Championships athletes for Japan
Japan Championships in Athletics winners